Gradska is a village in the municipality of Crna Trava, Serbia. According to the 2011 census, the village has a population of 254 people, down from 337 in 2002.

References

Populated places in Jablanica District